McGirr
Recorded as McGerr, McGirr, McGeer, and probably others, is an early Scottish and Irish surname, common in Ulster. It derives from the pre-10th century Gaelic 'Mac an gHeairr' which is believed to translate as 'the son of the short man'. What is certain is that almost all Gaelic surnames whether Scottish or Irish that are not locational, derive from a nickname for the first nameholder or chief. Some of these original names were at best robust and often obscene for modern tastes, so that over the years the meaning has been largely toned down. That is not the case here, and will refer to the physical size of the chief, at a time when generally people were small in stature in any case. Perhaps like many nicknames, the reverse applied, and the chief was actually tall.

The first known recordings of the surname are in Ireland in 1602. No individual are mentioned merely that the nameholders in County Armagh are called MacEghir. Later in 1628 the name-holders are mentioned as being 'numerous in County Armagh'. The first known recording of an individual is that of Mobert M'Girre of Dalbeattie, Scotland in 1658, whilst Shane MacGirr of Fintona in Northern Ireland was a Jacobite who was outlawed after the battle of the Boyne in 1690. He is believed to have joined the Irish armies of the king of France. Elizabeth McGerr was a famine emigrant who left Ireland on the ship "Garrick of Liverpool" on May 15, 1847, bound for New York.

Dispersions and Variations of the Name
It may be derived from an epithet or may be a calque or phono-semantic match to the Irish word gearr which translates as short. According to the Irish Times Households in the 19th Century database, 'Gear' as a surname was found to be exclusive to Cork, Kerry, Limerick, Kilkenny and Offaly with the majority in Kerry. However, 70% of McGirr households in the 19th Century were found in Tyrone and almost exclusively in Ulster. The name McGirr is most common in Tyrone and is associated with the Cenél Fearadhaigh of Clogher barony.

The Annals of Ulster states that Cu-Uladh (The hound of Ulster) McGhirr-McCawell (MacCathmhaoil), 'chieftain of his own tribe', was an illustrious professor of science in England in 1368. In the aftermath of the Great Famine with the mass emigration of Irish it was very common for Irish to conceal their roots to avoid discrimination and names were commonly changed, i.e. O'Donnell to Dodds. There are Shorts listed in Kirkcudbrightshire east Scotland and a few McGirrs; however, the McGirr name is far more prominent in Ireland than in Scotland. The Ulster Annals show Cu-Uladh McGhirr-McCawell (MacCathmhaoil) was perhaps too well established to be among the gallóglaigh. Edward Shortt, the son of a vicar who served as British Home secretary in the 1920s, has family roots that originate from County Tyrone.

Feradach, of the Cenél Fearadhaigh, was the son of Muiredach and great-grandson of Niall, whose descendants included the MacCawells (MacCathmhaoil), as well as the Irish Campbells in the Clogher area. MacGilmartin were chiefs in the barony of Clogher, and one was chief of Cenel Fearadaigh in 1166.

In 1365 when Malachy of the Mac Cathmhaoil, the ruling house of Clogher, slew an O'Neill of Tír Eoghain, Malachy was known as ''. Translated, this is Malachy the son of the short-fellow Mac Cathmhaoil. This feat of slaying an O’Neill warranted a change of name so he became Malachy  or simply Malachy MacGirr. Later this family survived the Ulster Plantation, receiving a number of grants of lands at the time. They are to be found later in the 1660s as taxpayers in the Clogher Valley and elsewhere in Tyrone. Today the family is generally found as McGirr, McGerr, McKerr and in the anglicised version as Short.

Individuals with the name McGirr
Eamonn McGirr (1940–2004), Irish-born entertainer in New York's Capital District area
Edmund McGirr, one of the pseudonyms of writer Kenneth Giles
Edward McCombie McGirr (1916–2003), Scottish professor of medicine
Ernest McGirr, Q.C. (1887–1982), politician in Manitoba, Canada
Fritz McGirr, musician with Scythian (band)
Greg McGirr (1879–1949), Australian politician, elected as a member of the New South Wales Legislative Assembly
Herb McGirr (1891–1964), New Zealand cricketer who played in two Tests in 1930
James McGirr (1890–1957), the Labor Premier of New South Wales from 6 February 1947 to 3 April 1952
James McGirr Kelly (1928–2005), United States federal judge
Joe McGirr (born 1960), Australian politician
Les McGirr (1897– ?), former football (soccer) player who represented New Zealand at the international level
Patrick McGirr (1874–1957), Australian politician
William McGirr (1857–1934), New Zealand cricketer

See also 
McGirr, Illinois

References